= Vedder Mountain (New York) =

Mountain in New York, United States

- Location within New York Adirondack Park Location within the United States

Highest point
- Elevation: 630 feet (190 m)
- Coordinates: 42°14′30″N 73°55′07″W

Geography
- Location: ENE of Lawrenceville, New York, U.S.
- Topo map: USGS Cementon

Vedder Mountain is a mountain in Greene County, New York. It is located in the Catskill Mountains east-northeast of Lawrenceville. Bethel Ridge is located southwest, and Timmerman Hill is located south-southwest of Vedder Mountain.
