= Bethel Ridge =

Ridge in Greene County, New York

- Location within New York Adirondack Park Location within the United States

Highest point
- Elevation: 518 feet (158 m)
- Coordinates: 42°13′20″N 73°56′36″W

Geography
- Location: E of Lawrenceville, New York, U.S.
- Topo map: USGS Cementon

Bethel Ridge is a ridge in Greene County, New York. It is located in the Catskill Mountains east of Lawrenceville. Vedder Mountain is located northeast, and Timmerman Hill is located south of Bethel Ridge.
