= Timmerman Hill =

Mountain in New York, United States

- Location within New York Adirondack Park Location within the United States

Highest point
- Elevation: 594 feet (181 m)
- Coordinates: 42°10′56″N 73°56′50″W

Geography
- Location: SE of Lawrenceville, New York, U.S.
- Topo map: USGS Cementon

Timmerman Hill is a mountain in Greene County, New York. It is located in the Catskill Mountains southeast of Lawrenceville. Bethel Ridge is located north, and Vedder Mountain is located north-northeast of Timmerman Hill.
